Ivan Olivari (born 28 January 1987) is a Croatian alpine skier. He competed in the men's super-G at the 2006 Winter Olympics.

References

External links
 

1987 births
Living people
Croatian male alpine skiers
Olympic alpine skiers of Croatia
Alpine skiers at the 2006 Winter Olympics
Sportspeople from Zagreb
21st-century Croatian people